The Canton of Saint-Paul-de-Fenouillet is a French former canton of Pyrénées-Orientales department, in Languedoc-Roussillon. It had 4,172 inhabitants (2012). It was disbanded following the French canton reorganisation which came into effect in March 2015. It consisted of 11 communes, which joined the new canton of La Vallée de l'Agly in 2015.

The canton comprised the following communes:

Saint-Paul-de-Fenouillet
Ansignan
Caudiès-de-Fenouillèdes
Fenouillet
Fosse
Lesquerde
Maury
Prugnanes
Saint-Arnac
Saint-Martin-de-Fenouillet
Vira

References

Saint Paul de Fenouillet
2015 disestablishments in France
States and territories disestablished in 2015